Gjert Andersen (born 17 March 1947) is a Norwegian skier. He was born in Bærum and represented the club Stabæk IF. He competed in Nordic combined at the 1968 Winter Olympics in Grenoble, and at the 1972 Winter Olympics in Sapporo.

References

External links

1947 births
Living people
Sportspeople from Bærum
Norwegian male Nordic combined skiers
Olympic Nordic combined skiers of Norway
Nordic combined skiers at the 1968 Winter Olympics
Nordic combined skiers at the 1972 Winter Olympics
20th-century Norwegian people